Out of Inferno is a 2013 Hong Kong-Chinese disaster film directed by the Pang Brothers released on 3 October 2013. Starring Sean Lau, Louis Koo and Angelica Lee, the movie is about a fire that engulfs a high-rise building in southern China and the subsequent rescue mission by the city's fire department.

Plot
The film stars two estranged brothers in Guangzhou, Tai-kwan and Keung, who work as firefighters. The last time they spoke with one another was during the funeral of their father, four years before the events of the film. Keung, now retired from firefighting, operates a fire protection systems company. In the beginning of the film, he holds a celebration of the opening of the office of his company. Meanwhile, Tai-kwan's wife, Si-lok, is seeing a gynaecologist. The company and the doctor are in the same building. A fire breaks out in the basement and travels upwards. Tai-kwan, who submits his resignation before the fire breaks out, sends in his unit to fight the fire. Keung finds Si-lok and struggles to rescue her.

Cast 

 Sean Lau as Tai-kwan (S: 大军, T: 大軍, P: Dàjūn, J: daai6 gwan1)
 Louis Koo as Keung (S: 阿强, T: 阿強, P: Ā-qiáng)
 Chen Sicheng as Lee Kin-lok (S: 李健乐, T: 李健樂, P: Lǐ Jiànlè), Si Lok's doctor
 Angelica Lee as Si-lok (S: 思乐, T: 思樂, P: Sīlè), Tai Kwan's wife
 Marc Ma as Ho, jewelry store worker
 Jin Qiaoqiao as Mei-mei (C: 美美, P: Měiměi, J: mei5 mei5), Shun's wife
 Crystal Lee (李馨巧) as Lam-lam (C: 琳琳, P: Línlín, J: lam4 lam4), Mei-mei and Shun's daughter
 Zang Jinsheng as Ko Sing, head of security guard
 Cheung Siu-fai as Shun (C: 阿信, P: Ā-xìn), May May's husband
 Joe Ma as Lau Ting, head of fire department
 Natalie Tong as Ping-ping, Keung's fiancé
 Benz Hui as Boss Suen, owner of the jewelry store
 Tian Zhenwei as Dong, jewelry store worker
 Terence Siufay as Bo-keung, security guard
 Jackie Xu as Mandy, Keung's assistant

Production 
The Pang Brothers went to great lengths to ensure authenticity of the fire scenes, actual fire was used for the majority of the film to bring out the actual visceral fear from the cast. The film had a budget of HK$150 million (US$19 million).

Reception
Yvonne Teh of the South China Morning Post gave the film three out of five stars. Teh stated that the script "looks a clear case of too many cooks spoiling the broth" and that Szeto Kam-yuen's death had harmed it. Teh stated that the acting of Koo, Lau, and Lee benefited the film and that "the raging fire, which hisses, roars, and moves in ways that resembles a mythical, dragon-like creature at times, is suitably menacing, and ensures that there are scenes in this action thriller that do feel suspenseful." Teh argued that the film is "weakest when the attention is focused on hackneyed minor characters" with the diamond cutter characters being the "lamest of all".

Film Business Asia's Derek Elley gave the film a 7/10 rating.

References

External links 
 

Chinese 3D films
2013 films
2010s Cantonese-language films
Hong Kong action films
Hong Kong 3D films
Chinese action films
Chinese disaster films
Hong Kong disaster films
Films about firefighting
Films set in Guangzhou
2013 3D films
2010s Mandarin-language films
2010s Hong Kong films